is the largest island in the Amakusa archipelago. Its coasts are washed by Ariake Sea, Amakusa-nada sea, East China Sea and Yatsushiro Sea. Most of Shimoshima Island is administered as part of Amakusa city, with 67 km2 patch on north-west coast belonging to Reihoku town. The island's highest peak is Mount Tenjiku .

Transportation
Shimoshima is connected to Kamishima island, and through it to Kyushu mainland, by  bridge (completed in 1966) and pedestrian bridge over 70-meter wide tidal channel. It is also connected by Ushibukahaiyao Bridge to the Gezu Island on the southern tip. The national roads serving the island are the Route 266, Route 324 and Route 389.

The Amakusa Airfield on the north of the island provide a scheduled services to the Itami Airport, Fukuoka Airport and Kumamoto Airport since opening in 2000.

The public transportation inside the island is provided by the extensive bus network with the hub in Hondo Bus Center near the bridge to the mainland.

At least five ferry lines also connect the Shimoshima island to other islands in Kagoshima, Kumamoto and Nagasaki prefectures.

Climate
Shimoshima Island is located in the humid subtropical climate zone (Köppen Cfa), with four distinct seasons. During the winter, the higher elevations see some snowfall, but the lower, populated areas seldom do. Spring in Shimoshima Island starts off mild, but ends up being hot and humid. The summer tends to be Shimoshima's wettest season, with the  — the rainy season — occurring between early June (average:Jun.7) to late July (average:Jul.21). The island's weather is affected by the nearby  while being shielded from the warm Kuroshio Current by a part of the Kyushu island, resulting in wetter and colder climate than should be expected at lower 30's latitudes.

Attractions
Amakusa Christian museum
"Dolphin`s world" public aquarium
Tomioka Castle

See also
Amakusa
Kamishima Island, Amakusa
5 Pairs of Shoes - a novel written in 1907, involving Shimoshima island
This article incorporates material from Japanese Wikipedia page 下島 (天草諸島), accessed 3 August 2017

External links
 熊本県の島＞天草諸島＞天草下島（あまくさしもしま

References

Islands of Kumamoto Prefecture
Islands of the East China Sea